The 2012 Men's EuroHockey Junior Championship was the 16th edition of the men's EuroHockey Junior Championship, the biennial international men's under-21 field hockey championship of Europe organised by the European Hockey Federation. It was held alongside the women's tournament in 's-Hertogenbosch, Netherlands from 20 August to 1 September 2012.

This tournament served as the European qualifier for the 2013 FIH Junior World Cup, with the top six teams qualifying.

Belgium won the tournament for the first time by defeating the Netherlands 4–3 in penalties after the final finished as a 2–2 draw. Germany won the bronze model by defeating France 8–0.

Qualified teams
The following eight team qualified based on their final positions in the 2010 EuroHockey Junior Championships.

Results
All times are local, CEST (UTC+2).

Preliminary round

Pool A

Pool B

Classification round

Fifth to eighth place classification

Pool C

First to fourth place classification

Semi-finals

Third and fourth place

Final

Awards

Statistics

Final standings

Goalscorers

References

EuroHockey Junior Championship
Junior 1
International field hockey competitions hosted by the Netherlands
EuroHockey Junior Championship
EuroHockey Junior Championship
EuroHockey Junior Championship
EuroHockey Championship